Secretly Canadian is an American independent record label based in Bloomington, Indiana, with offices in New York, Los Angeles, Chicago, Austin, London, Paris, Amsterdam, and Berlin. Secretly Canadian is a label included in Secretly Group, which also includes Dead Oceans and Jagjaguwar. Secretly Group includes the three record labels as well as a music publisher known as Secretly Publishing, representing artists, writers, film makers, producers, and comedians.

History
Secretly Canadian was founded in 1996 by Chris and Ben Swanson, Eric Weddle, and Jonathan Cargill while they attended Indiana University. The Swanson brothers, originally from Fargo, North Dakota, decided to move to Bloomington after a Billboard article painted the Midwestern college town's scene as the next Seattle and an incubator for up-and-coming bands.

Before Secretly Canadian was founded, Chris Swanson and Eric Weddle met in 1995 as sophomores involved in Indiana University's campus radio station, WIUX. Then Chris met Jonathan Cargill through a job at the Collins Living-Learning Center cafeteria on campus. Soon after, Chris' younger brother Ben Swanson moved to Bloomington to earn his undergraduate degree from the Jacobs School of Music in ethnomusicology.

In 1996, Secretly Canadian was founded out of the Swansons' house. They had little experience and spent months researching how to make a CD.

The label's first official release was a re-issue of an album by June Panic from Grand Forks, North Dakota; the Glory Hole CD. The second release in 1997 was Jason Molina's, under the Songs: Ohia moniker, often referred to as "The Black Album". After the Swanson brothers tracked down Molina's email address and drove hours to Molina's in-store gig at Adult Crash in New York. After signing Molina, the record label became more popular in the indie music scene.

Secretly Canadian then signed other notable early releases, including Marmoset and Swearing At Motorists.

Weddle soon left to form label Family Vineyard – and later followed by Cargill as well. After that, Chris Swanson and Darius Van Arman became friends in 1999 and Secretly Canadian joined forces with Van Arman's Jagjaguwar.

The early 2000s yielded reissues from Swell Maps, Nikki Sudden, and Danielson. Damien Jurado, the Seattle singer-songwriter, made his way to Secretly Canadian in 2002. Two years later, Jens Lekman joined the label's roster.

Anohni also signed to the label in the 2000s. Formerly known as Antony and the Johnsons earlier in her career, the Swanson brothers became enamored with Antony and the Johnsons’ self-titled debut from 2000. Antony and the Johnsons’ first record with Secretly Canadian, I Am a Bird Now, released in 2005, sold 100,000 copies in the first two months.

Secretly Canadian then signed The War on Drugs, the Philadelphia-based band whose third record, Lost in the Dream, struck as both a critical and commercial success in 2014. Secretly Canadian also began a partnership with  Chimera Records in the form of Yoko Ono's reissues beginning in 2016, and the debut release from William Eggleston, in 2017. Secretly Canadian's roster also includes Cherry Glazerr, Whitney, Alex Cameron, Joey Dosik, Stella Donnelly, Faye Webster, and serpentwithfeet, among many others.

In 2007, the addition of Dead Oceans to Secretly Canadian and Jagjaguwar's partnership led to the formation of Secretly Group. In 2015, Secretly Group began a partnership with The Numero Group as well.

In 2018, Secretly Canadian was listed as #8 on Paste Magazines top 10 record labels of 2018. Jagjaguwar was listed as #4 and Dead Oceans was listed as #7.

Artists

 Alasdair Roberts
 Alex Cameron
 Anohni
 Antony and the Johnsons
 Ativin
 Ben Abraham
 BLK JKS
 Bobb Trimble
 Bodies of Water
 Catfish Haven
 Cayucas
 Cherry Glazerr
 Damien Jurado
 Danielson
 Dave Fischoff
 David Vandervelde
 Don Lennon
 Dungeonesse
 Early Day Miners
 Electric Youth
 Emily Angeles
 Faye Webster
 Foreign Born
 Frida Hyvonen
 Gardens & Villa
 Havergal
 The Horns of Happiness
 I Love You But I've Chosen Darkness
 The Impossible Shapes
 Instruments of Science & Technology
 Intro to Airlift
 Jason Molina
 The Japonize Elephants
 Jens Lekman
 JJ
 Joey Dosik
 Jorma Whittaker
 June Panic
 Little Scream
 Luke Temple
 Magnolia Electric Co.
 Major Lazer
 Makeness
 Marmoset
 Molina and Johnson
 Music Go Music
 Nightlands
 Nikki Sudden & The Jacobites
 Nite Jewel
 Normanoak
 The Panoply Academy
 Porcelain Raft
 Porridge Radio
 Racebannon
 Richard Swift
 Scout Niblett
 serpentwithfeet
 She-Devils
 Shura
 Simon Joyner
 Songs: Ohia
 Stella Donnelly
 Steven A. Clark
 Suuns
 Suzanne Langille & Loren MazzaCane Connors
 Swearing at Motorists
 Swell Maps
 Taken By Trees
 Throw Me The Statue
 Tig Notaro
 Tomas Barfod
 Tren Brothers
 The War on Drugs
 Whitney
 Windsor for the Derby
 Woman's Hour
 Yeasayer
 Yoko Ono
 Zero Boys

Notable awards and honors
A2IM LIBERA AWARDS (US)
2015, Secretly Canadian, Label of the Year (finalist)
2014, Secretly Canadian, Label of the Year (finalist)

AIM INDEPENDENT MUSIC AWARDS (UK)
2014, Secretly Group – Independent Label of the Year (nominated)

See also
Secretly Group
Dead Oceans
Jagjaguwar

References

External links
Official site
SC Distribution

Record labels established in 1996
American independent record labels
Indie rock record labels
Bloomington, Indiana